Charlie Says is a 2006 French drama film. It was entered into the 2006 Cannes Film Festival.

Plot
Charlie is a little boy in a small French village at the Atlantic coast. For three days he watches seven men who occasionally meet each other.

Cast 
Jean-Pierre Bacri as Jean-Louis Bertagnat
Vincent Lindon as Serge
Benoît Magimel as Pierre
Benoît Poelvoorde as Joss
Patrick Pineau as Mathieu
Arnaud Valois as Adrien
Ferdinand Martin as Charlie
Minna Haapkylä as Nora
Sophie Cattani as Séverine
Philippe Lefebvre as Pierre-Yves
Philippe Magnan as Ricordi
Samir Guesmi as Mo
Jérôme Robart as Ballhaus
Valérie Benguigui as Charlie's mother
Grégoire Leprince-Ringuet as Thierry

References

External links

Charlie Says at unifrance.org

2006 films
2006 drama films
2000s French-language films
Films directed by Nicole Garcia
French drama films
2000s French films